Giants of Rock was an annual hard rock and heavy metal festival in Hämeenlinna, Finland. It was held from 1987 to 1992 at Ahvenisto Race Circuit. The 1992 festival caused financial losses for organizers due to cancellations of some headlining acts. The last festival was arranged in 1994 as Power of Rock.

In 1988 Motörhead recorded their performance. It was later released as the band's second live album Nö Sleep at All.

Main acts
15 August 1987
Dio
Helloween
2 July 1988
Motörhead
Girlschool
Hurriganes
1 July 1989
Anthrax
Suicidal Tendencies
D-A-D
28 July 1990
Uriah Heep
Sodom
Running Wild
Pretty Maids
6 July 1991
Sepultura
U.D.O.
Winger
Rage
The Almighty
Power of Rock, 2 July 1994
Accept
Obituary

Sources
Tapio's Home Page/Concert Experiences
motorheadoverkill.se

Rock festivals in Finland
Heavy metal festivals in Finland
Summer events in Finland